Gourahari Das is a creative writer, journalist and an academician.

Born in 1960, in a back of the beyond village in the district of Bhadrak (formerly a part of Balasore) of state Odisha in India, Gourahari grew up with keen eyes of observation and sensibility which shaped his creative being.

He had a very difficult childhood and had to struggle hard to get education. He had to leave his home at the age of eight and live in a monastery. A scholarship helped him to further his school education. After his school education, he came to Cuttack and took up variety of works to support his studies. He worked during dayhours and studied in evening colleges. He completed BA from Ravenshaw Evening College Cuttack. Subsequently, he did his master's degree in Odia language and literature from Utkal University. Later he studied MJMC and was awarded a gold medal. He holds a Ph.D. from Utkal University too.

A recipient of Sahitya Akademi Award, India Gourahari is a creative writer, editor and columnist. His first book  “ Juara Bhatta” which is a collection of short stories, was published in 1981 when he was still pursuing his studies in Ravenshaw Evening College. Besides writing fictions he also writes regular columns in newspaper  SAMBAD which are very popular. He is also the recipient of prestigious Koraput Literary Award 2019, from Odia Media Private Limited, the organiser of Koraput Literary Festival.

Career 
He joined in SAMBAD (the largest Daily of Odisha) in 1985 as a trainee sub-editor and rose up to become an editor of this Media House. His long association with Sambad Group gave him an opportunity to explore his multi-faceted talent. He started writing his popular columns “Jibanara Jalachhabi” ( Vignetts of Life) and “ Rajadhani Rajaniti” ( Power Politics of the Capital) in this newspaper which brought him prominence. While the first one is a creative commentary on human life the later is a political satire. Later he became the editor of KATHA (the fiction monthly of Sambad Group). He is also the principal of Sambad School of Media and Culture, a pioneer media institute affiliated to Utkal University of Culture since 2007.

Creative journey 
Gourahari started writing short stories from very early age. In fact his first short story "Kshinaloka" was published in  the magazine 'Kalyani' when he was only 15 years old. Soon he took up writing seriously and to date he has more than 51 books to his credit. These include novels, short stories, essays, plays, poems, translations and vignettes. He has also written travelogues on US, Sweden and China.

As a journalist he has devoted much of his energy in eradicating superstition such as witchcraft and animal sacrifice. His comments on certain practices at Sri Jagannath temple at Puri and other places of worship have put him in the bracket of journalists with conviction. His column "Odisha Diary"  which appears in special occasions is  a popular one in Odisha.

Other activities 
He is associated with Sahitya Akademi (India's highest body of letters) since 2008- first as a member of Odia advisory board and then a member of executive board and general council.

He is associated with a number of socio-cultural organizations of Odisha which work for betterment of human life and building better society. He is the president of Shatabdira Kalajkar, a leading theatre group of Odisha and advisor of Trishakti Mahila Samiti, a prominent women's organization. Besides he is a member of Utkal Sahitya Samaj, the oldest cultural body of Odisha. He was a member of Regional Film Censor Board from 2012 to 2015.

Travel 
He has traveled different countries and participated in cultural exchange programmes. He visited the United States in 1996 and again in 2000 to deliver speeches at Annual Conference of OSA. (Odisha Society of Americas) in Washington, D.C., and Nashvalley. He had been to China in 2002 as a Member of Indian Writers Delegation and participated in Frankfurt Book Fair, Germany in 2014. He has visited Sweden, UK, Netherland, France, Czech, Slovakia, Switzerland, Italy, Belgium and Austria.

Selected works

Novels 
 Chhayasoudhara Abasesha 1996
 Nija Sange Nijara Ladhei1999
 Eithu Arambha 2005
 Apananka Angyadhina 2010
 Kete Rangara Jibana 2013

Short story collections 
 Akhada Ghara
 Swapna Pain Rati Kahin
 Bharatabarsha
 Maati Kandhei
 Maaya
 Sesha Baji
 Punarabrutti
 Ghara
 Kagajadanga
 Ahalyara Bahaghara
 Mathurara Manachitra
 Kanta O Anyanya Galpa
 Analeuta O Anyanya Galpa

Vignettes 
 Jibanara Jalachhabi
 Chinha Chouhadi
 Bhinna Bhumika
 Parichita Paridhi
 Asamartha Ishwara
 Hatalekha Chithi

Plays 
 Aparadha
 Asami (in press)
 Maya

Poems 
 Paunshara Pandulipi

Essays 
 Odisha Diary
 Kahara Odisha
 Kathabarta
 Katha Sarinahin

Editing 
 Piladina
 Prema
 Suryastara Ranga
 Karmayogi Phakiracharan
 Bhala Galpa: Bhumi O Bhumika
 Swadhinottara Odia Kshudragalpa
 Odia Galpa: Kali, Aji O Kali

Travelogues 
 Pratham Prabash
 Dui Diganta
 Chinha Achinha Chin

Translation 
 Yashpalnka Kahanimala
 Mitro Marjani
 Bhagaban Rajanish
 Sehisabu Piladina
 Gotie Jiban Jathesta Nuhen
 Chheli Charaibar Dina

Books in Hindi 
 Door Akash Ka Pancchi
 Mathuraka Manachitra
 Kanhu Ka Ghar ( In Press)

Books in English 
 The Little Monk and Other stories
 Koraput and Other Stories (in press)

Adaptations 
Many of his stories has been adapted as TV films directed by Nirad Mahapatra, Basant Sahu, Dhira Mallik, Nandalal Mahapatra and telecast on DD, ETV and other TV channels. His stories such as "Asami", "Maya", "Shikuli" have been made into stage plays and directed by Dhira Mallik, Pabitra Mohanty, Darpa Sethi and Ajit Dash.

Inspired from his short story, Bapa a movie Pratikshya has been made.

Awards 

 Sahitya Akademi, India-2012
 Odisha Sahitya Akademi -2001
 Koraput Sahitya Samman -2019 
(during the annual Koraput Literary Festival organised by Odia Media Private Limited)
 Odisha Living Legend Award-2014
 Sangeet Natak Akademi Recognition-2001
 Utkal Sahitya Samaj Samman,
 Sambalpur University Award
 Sahitya Bharati Young Writer Award
 Fakirmohan Sahitya Parishad Samman
 Bhubaneswar Book Fair Award
 Katha Gourav Award
 Kanika Gourav Award and many more
 Sahitya Akademi Translation Prize for his translation Chheli Charaibar Dina.
 Sarala Award 2022 for short story collection 'Bagha O Anyanya Galpa'.

Fellowship 
 Senior Fellowship of Ministry of Culture, India-2011
 Writer in Residency, Sahitya Akademi, New Delhi-2010
 Junior Fellowship of Ministry of Culture, India

Other associations 
 Member of executive committee of Sahitya Akademi, New Delhi 2013–2017
 Member of Odia advisory board of Sahitya Akademi, 2008–2017
 Member of Regional Film Censor Board 2012–2016
 President, Satabdira Kalakar, (premier theatre group of Odisha) since 2014
 Director, News of KANAK TV 2009-2011
 Principal, Sambad School of Media and Culture since 2007

Countries visited 
US, Sweden, China, Germany, UK, Netherland, Belgium, France, Czech Republic, Slovakia, Austria, Italy, Vatican City, Switzerland

Comments on his stories 
Short stories of Gourahari show deep insight into human nature and the resilience of the human spirit. –Ruskin Bond

Gourahari Das sensitively chronicles the lives of the characters, and deftly probes their motives as they face life's exigencies, deal with moral dilemmas, experience crises of survival, or simply try to cope with the complicated business of living. – Jatin Nayak

References

1960 births
Living people
People from Bhadrak district
Recipients of the Sahitya Akademi Award in Odia
Indian male novelists
Odia-language writers
20th-century Indian novelists
Novelists from Odisha
20th-century Indian male writers
Recipients of the Sahitya Akademi Prize for Translation